A backyard breeder is an amateur animal breeder whose breeding is considered substandard, with little or misguided effort towards ethical, selective breeding. Unlike puppy mills and other animal mill operations, backyard breeders breed on a small scale, usually at home with their own pets (hence the "backyard" description), and may be motivated by things such as monetary profit, curiosity, to gain new pets and/or working animals, or to show children "the miracle of birth".

A backyard breeder is often a substandard breeder of dogs, cats, rats, birds, horses and/or any other kind of domestic companion animal, and the term is used in this sense by the Animal Welfare community, The American Society for the Prevention of Cruelty to Animals (ASPCA), larger established breeders and breed clubs in contrast to the more positive terms "reputable breeder" and "responsible breeder" that describes operations that use responsible animal husbandry and animal breeding methodologies and practices. The ASPCA's definition of a responsible breeder includes one who is mindful to breed for health and function, screens for known heritable deficiencies, breeds physically sound and behaviorally stable dogs and cats, and avoids inbreeding.

Backyard breeding implies either or both of home breeding for non-commercial reasons or a for-profit small commercial operation that does not adhere to good breeding, care and sale practices. Backyard breeders sell the offspring of their animals either to pet stores, directly to pet buyers in person or to pet buyers over the internet. Larger commercial operations of a similar type that breed dogs and/or cats are usually termed a puppy mill (especially in North America) or puppy farm for dogs and a cat mill for cats.  However, as large kennels usually require licensing, many puppy mills are licensed with the USDA.

Many small breeders resent the term and its use. Some do so because they assert that they run small but high-quality "boutique" operations. Others argue that their unregistered animals are desirable as companion animals and economical for ordinary people to purchase. Many times backyard breeders choose profit over animal welfare, their animals typically do not receive proper veterinary care. Animals may seem healthy at first but later show issues like congenital eye and hip defects, parasites or even the deadly Parvovirus. The result of this poor care results in unwanted animals.

It has been suggested that backyard breeding continues because there is a market for cats and dogs, especially for those who have been denied access to pet stocks from shelters, rescues and other agencies that may have very stringent adoption or purchase requirements, such as background checks and home visits.

Undesirable characteristics
This type of breeder is usually regarded by the Animal Welfare, ASPCA, and other groups as likely to exhibit one or more of the following characteristics:
Ignorance of selective breeding goals and techniques, and lack of familiarity with the breed standard of the type of animal being bred.
Exclusive focus on the breed standard involving little genetic screening or co-efficient of Inbreeding calculations.
Breeding of a working breed for appearance rather than working ability. This is a criticism also levelled at 'reputable' breeders who breed for the show ring - in some cases distinct working and show strains have emerged.
Lack of adequate veterinary care and maintenance.
Excessive breeding from individual females, to the detriment of their health.
Sale of animals with genetic disorders or undisclosed illnesses before they become evident to buyers.
Lack of screening of potential owners or the provision of suitable information to prevent buyers from purchasing an animal that may be inappropriate for them or their lifestyle.
Breeding of animals for illegitimate reasons, such as for horse slaughter or the usually illegal sports of baiting and dog fighting or to defend venues of criminal activity. Dog fanciers generally believe that such ill-bred dogs are the reason for the bad reputation of some breeds in the public perception, and the resulting breed-specific legislation.  The production of "PMU foals" from pregnant mares bred solely for their urine production (used in the making of the drug Premarin) is also widely condemned due to the frequency with which the progeny of such breedings are shipped directly to slaughter.
Breeding without concern for the possibility of finding homes, though commercial means or otherwise, for offspring, thus adding to the population of unwanted dogs and cats and to the slaughter of horses for meat.

Opposition to

There are campaigns to reduce or eliminate this type of breeding in several countries as well as video campaigns by groups like ASPCA that emphasize the importance of understanding the responsibilities associated with owning an animal. The primary concern of the Animal Welfare community is that this type of breeding is the major source of pet animals and that overproduction has led to overpopulation and hence to welfare issues and the putting down of animals for no other reason than the lack of suitable home. The glamorization of Chihuahuas, which some claim has been generated by Hollywood, has had devastating outcomes for dogs and their adopted owners. Specifically, dog owners like Paris Hilton and commercial-star Gidget the Taco Bell chihuahua as well as films like Beverly Hills Chihuahua have been directly cited as blameworthy. Most dog breed societies and Kennel Clubs have similar concerns but place rather more stress on issues relating to breed standardization and quality.

There are many animal adoption alternatives that potential pet owners can consider, including local animal shelters and the umbrella organization The Shelter Pet Project, animal rescue groups, online organizations such as Petfinder that directly connect prospective adopters with available animals and local shelters, and print media such as local newspapers.

See also
Pet culture
List of domesticated animals
Pet industry
Animal hoarding
Cruelty to animals

References

External links
CKC: Finding a Reputable Breeder

Breeding
Cruelty to animals
Dogs
Cats
Livestock
Illegal occupations
Organized crime activity
Working animals